Vincelles may refer to:
Vincelles, Jura, a commune in the French region of Franche-Comté
Vincelles, Marne, a commune in the French region of Champagne-Ardenne
Vincelles, Saône-et-Loire, a commune in the French region of Bourgogne
Vincelles, Yonne, a commune in the French region of Bourgogne